Leibnitzia lyrata, common name Seemann's sunbonnet, is a plant species widespread across much of Mexico and also found in the US states of Arizona and New Mexico. It is found in open locations in pine-oak woodlands, often in disturbed areas.

Leibnitzia lyrata is a perennial herb up to 60 cm (2 feet) tall. Heads are borne singly. Outer florets of the head are pink to purplish, the inner florets white. Flowers tend to be fully open early in the season but remain closed and self-fertilizing later in the year.

References

lyrata
Flora of Mexico
Flora of New Mexico
Flora of Arizona